The XIX Racquetball European Championships were held in The Hague, (Netherlands) from September 13 to 16 2017, with four men's national teams and three women's national teams in competition. No senior or junior competitions were held in The Hague due to the lack of court time. This marks the first time since 1995 that the European Racquetball Championships were not held in one venue.

The venue was the Westvliet Welness & Racquet Club, near The Hague, with 1 regulation racquetball court. The 4 men's teams were Germany, Ireland, Italy and The Netherlands and the 3 women's teams were Germany, Ireland and the Netherlands. Team Belgium dropped out to several injured players only a few days before the beginning of the competition. In total, 6 nations competed in the Individual competition with players from Belgium, Germany, Ireland, Italy Poland and The Netherlands.

The opening ceremony was on September 13 with the president of European Racquetball Federation, Mike Mesecke, and the president of Nederlands Racquetball Association, Erik Timmermanns. The Closing Ceremony was held in attendance of 7-time European Singles Champion Joachim Loof (Germany), 5-time European Doubles Champion Trevor Meyer (Germany) as well as former ERF President Erik Meyer (Belgium).

Men's national teams competition

Final round
September 13/14, 2017

Semifinals 

3rd and 4th places 

FINAL

Men's teams final standings

Women's national teams competition

Women's teams final standings

Men's Single competition

Women's Single competition

Men's Doubles competition

Women's Doubles competition

See also
European Racquetball Championships

External links
Team Standings  ERF website
Men's singles results
Ladies singles results
Mens doubles results
Ladies doubles results

References 

Racquetball
International sports competitions hosted by the Netherlands
European Racquetball Championships
2017 in Dutch sport
Racquetball in the Netherlands